Aramaic studies are scientific studies of the Aramaic languages and cultural history of Arameans. As a specific field within Semitic studies, Aramaic studies are closely related to similar disciplines, like Hebraic studies and Arabic studies.

As a distinctive academic discipline, Aramaic studies started to develop during the Early Modern period, and they were initially focused on the study of the Christian Aramaic heritage, embodied in Syriac language and cultural traditions of Syriac Christianity. The field was gradually widened, and by the 19th century expanded towards studies of ancient Aramaic heritage, that included all of the oldest (pre-Christian) varieties of Aramaic languages, and ancient Aramaic alphabet. On the other side, the field was also expanded towards modern periods, focused on the study of the remaining Neo-Aramaic languages, and modern cultural heritage of Neo-Aramaic communities.

During the 19th century, Aramaic studies were constituted as a modern scientific field of research. In the process, several traditional misconceptions were challenged and consequently abandoned, most notable of them being the long-standing "Chaldean misnomer" (Chaldaic, Chaldee) for the Biblical Aramaic. The exonymic origin and nature of the ancient Greek use of "Syrian" labels as designations for ancient Arameans and their language (in Septuagint and other Greek sources) was also analyzed, but conventional Syrian/Syriac nomenclature was kept in reference to Edessan Aramaic language, still labeled as Classical Syriac.

One of the main issues within the field was the question of historical periodization of Aramaic language, and adoption of specific terms for various historical stages, and branches of the Aramaic linguistic tree.

In modern times, Aramaic studies are organized within distinctive academic centers and programs, like those at the University of Oxford, University of Leiden, and University of Detroit Mercy. At some other universities, Aramaic studies are mostly incorporated into a more 'general' field of studies, such as Eastern Christianity at the School of Oriental and African Studies, University of London, as Eastern Christianity at Duke University, or as Semitic studies at the Freie Universität Berlin. Most students learn the Aramaic language and Syriac language within a biblical studies program.

Aramaic academic journals include the annual Aramaic Studies, a leading journal for Aramaic language and literature published by Brill Academic Publishers. The journal incorporates the previous Journal for the Aramaic Bible for a more inclusive scope, to include all aspects of Aramaic language and literature, even when not, or only indirectly, related to Biblical texts.

Specialists in Aramaic studies are known as Aramaicists, while scholars who are involved in Syriac studies are known as Syriacists.

Specific disciplines

Aramaic studies are branched into several disciplines, some of them interdisciplinary by nature of their research subjects, and thus shared with other closely related fields, like Jewish studies or Christian studies.

Neo-Aramaic studies

Neo-Aramaic studies represent a specific field of research within Aramaic studies, that is dedicated to the study of Neo-Aramaic languages, history and culture.

Syriac Aramaic studies

Syriac studies represent a specific field of research within Aramaic studies, that is dedicated to the study of Syriac language and Syriac Christianity.

Christian Aramaic studies
Christian Aramaic studies are an interdisciplinary field, both of Christian studies and of Aramaic studies, dedicated to the study of linguistic and cultural heritage of Aramaic-speaking Christian communities, historical and modern. Christian Aramaic studies emerged in Europe by the end of the 15th century, and developed gradually during the Early Modern period.

Jewish Aramaic studies
Jewish Aramaic studies are an interdisciplinary field, both of Jewish studies and of Aramaic studies, dedicated to the study of Judeo-Aramaic languages and cultural heritage of Aramaic-speaking Jewish communities, historical and modern.

Mandaean Aramaic studies
Mandaean Aramaic studies are an interdisciplinary field, both of Mandaean studies and of Aramaic studies, that is dedicated to the study of Mandaic language and cultural heritage of Aramaic-speaking Mandaean communities, historical and modern.

See also

References

Sources

 
 
 
 
 
 
 
 
 
 
 
 
 
 
 
 
 
 
 
 
 
 
 
 
 
  
 
 
 
 
 
 
 
 
 
 
 
 
 
 

Aramaic languages
Semitic studies
Cultural studies
Middle Eastern studies
Syriac Christianity